Charles William Gee (6 April 1909 – 1981) was an English international footballer, who played as a centre half.

Career
Born in Stockport, Gee played professionally for Everton, and earned three caps for England between 1931 and 1936.

References

1909 births
1981 deaths
English footballers
England international footballers
Everton F.C. players
English Football League players
English Football League representative players
Association football central defenders